Cordova is a village in Rock Island County, Illinois, United States. The population was 672 at the 2010 census, up from 633 in 2000.

Geography
Cordova is located at  (41.677423, -90.320704).

Power plant

The city is home to one of three nuclear power plants in the west central Illinois area.

Demographics

As of the census of 2000, there were 633 people, 245 households, and 179 families residing in the village. The racial makeup of the village was 96.37% White, 0.16% African American, 0.16% Asian, 0.32% Pacific Islander, 1.58% from other races, and 1.42% from two or more races. Hispanic or Latino of any race were 2.53% of the population.

There were 245 households, out of which 31.4% had children under the age of 18 living with them, 62.9% were married couples living together, 4.9% had a female householder with no husband present, and 26.9% were non-families. 24.5% of all households were made up of individuals, and 13.1% had someone living alone who was 65 years of age or older. The average household size was 2.57 and the average family size was 3.00.

In the village, the age distribution of the population shows 25.9% under the age of 18, 6.5% from 18 to 24, 27.6% from 25 to 44, 25.9% from 45 to 64, and 14.1% who were 65 years of age or older. The median age was 40 years. For every 100 females, there were 104.9 males. For every 100 females age 18 and over, there were 98.7 males.

The median income for a household in the village was $50,000, and the median income for a family was $59,063. Males had a median income of $45,179 versus $25,000 for females. The per capita income for the village was $21,442. About 4.2% of families and 6.2% of the population were below the poverty line, including 1.4% of those under age 18 and 20.5% of those age 65 or over.

Notable people

 Richard Morthland, former member of the Illinois House of Representatives. A resident of Cordova, he represented the city in the Illinois House from 2011 to 2013.
 William Shew, former Speaker of the House in Wisconsin Territory's legislature, later moved to Cordova and served as a village trustee and justice of the peace; died at his home in Cordova in 1883 
 Len Stockwell, outfielder for the Cleveland Blues, Louisville Eclipse and Cleveland Spiders; born in Cordova

References

Villages in Rock Island County, Illinois
Villages in Illinois
Cities in the Quad Cities
Illinois populated places on the Mississippi River